Crisfield is a surname. Notable people with the surname include:

Henry Crisfield (1877–1945), Australian rules footballer
John W. Crisfield (1806–1897), American politician
Michael Anthony Crisfield (1942–2002), British mathematician

See also
Crosfield (surname)

English-language surnames